Anthony Meeker (born March 18, 1939) is a politician in Oregon. He was appointed State Treasurer in 1987. Oregon Governor Neil Goldschmidt appointed him to fill the vacancy created when Bill Rutherford resigned from office. Meeker was elected to a full term in 1988. He had also served in the Oregon House of Representatives and in the Oregon State Senate.

Biography
Meeker was born in Amity, Oregon in 1939.

In 1986, Tony Meeker ran for Congress against Democrat Les AuCoin in Oregon's first congressional district. After losing to AuCoin, Meeker returned to the State Senate to continue his fifth term representing citizens in portions of Yamhill and Marion counties. Oregon State Treasurer Bill Rutherford announced he was stepping down to take a position in an investment firm in New York City. On July 9, 1987 Democratic Governor Neil Goldschmidt appointed Meeker, a Republican, to replace Rutherford, also a Republican, to fill the remainder of Rutherford's term. He made a second unsuccessful bid for U.S. Congress in 1992, losing to Elizabeth Furse. To date, he is the most recent Republican to serve as treasurer, all subsequent treasurers have been Democrats.

References

State treasurers of Oregon
1939 births
People from Yamhill County, Oregon
Republican Party members of the Oregon House of Representatives
Republican Party Oregon state senators
Living people